Shaun Irwin (born 8 December 1968) is an English former professional rugby league footballer who played in the 1980s and 1990s.

Background
Shaun Irwin was born in Pontefract, West Riding of Yorkshire, England.

Playing career

International honors
Irwin represented Great Britain under-21s four times between 1988 and 1990.

Irwin won caps for Great Britain while at Castleford in 1990 against France, Papua New Guinea, and New Zealand, and in 1990 in the 1989–1992 Rugby League World Cup against New Zealand.

First Division Grand Final appearances
Shaun Irwin played right-, i.e. number 3, in Featherstone Rovers' 22-24 defeat by Wakefield Trinity in the 1998 First Division Grand Final at McAlpine Stadium, Huddersfield on 26 September 1998.

County Cup Final appearances
Shaun Irwin played right-, i.e. number 3, in Castleford's 11-8 victory over Wakefield Trinity in the 1990 Yorkshire County Cup Final during the 1990–91 season at Elland Road, Leeds on Sunday 23 September 1990.

Outside of Rugby League
Shaun currently works as a Paramedic for the Yorkshire Ambulance Service.

References

External links
!Great Britain Statistics at englandrl.co.uk (statistics currently missing due to not having appeared for both Great Britain, and England)
 Statistics at rugbyleagueproject.org
(archived by web.archive.org) Profile at thecastlefordtigers.co.uk
Statistics at orl-heritagetrust.org.uk

1968 births
Living people
Castleford Tigers players
English rugby league players
Featherstone Rovers captains
Featherstone Rovers players
Great Britain national rugby league team players
Great Britain under-21 national rugby league team players
Oldham R.L.F.C. players
Rugby league centres
Rugby league players from Pontefract
Rugby league second-rows
Rugby league utility players